Białystok is a city in northeastern Poland.

Białystok or similar names may also refer to:

Administrative divisions around the Polish city
 Białystok County, current administrative division
Białystok Voivodeship, an administrative district of Poland
Białystok Voivodeship (1919–1939), as defined before World War II
Białystok Voivodeship (1945–1975), as defined after World War II
Białystok Voivodeship (1975–1998), as defined after 1975
 Bezirk Bialystok, administrative division under the Nazis
 Białystok Department of the Kingdom of Prussia

Other
 Białystok, Lublin Voivodeship, a village in southeastern Poland
 Belostok, Tomsk Oblast, a village in Russia
 Max Bialystock, the character played by Zero Mostel in Mel Brooks' The Producers
 Ellen Bialystok, psychologist and academic
 Bialy (bread) a circular bread, named after the city